Haydar al-Kuzbari (1920–1996) was a Syrian lieutenant colonel who took part in the 1961 Syrian coup d'état that led to the dissolution of the United Arab Republic. He was once offered from Saudi Arabia to be the general of Saudi Arabia but rejected the offer and remained the general of Syria. At one time he was a good friend of King Abdullah of Saudi Arabia.

See also
Maamun al-Kuzbari

External links
Syrian History Pictures
Profile

1920 births
1996 deaths
Syrian military personnel
People from Damascus